Årnäs is a village in Halland County, Sweden.

References

Populated places in Halland County